Faso-benkadi is a village in the Tansila Department of Banwa Province in western Burkina Faso. As of 2005 it had a population of 917.

References

Populated places in the Boucle du Mouhoun Region
Banwa Province